Rajab is the seventh month of the Islamic calendar. The lexical definition of the classical Arabic verb rajaba is "to respect", which could also mean "be awe or be in fear", of which Rajab is a derivative.

This month is regarded as one of the four sacred months (including Muharram, Dhu al-Qadah and Dhu al-Hijjah) in Islam in which battles are prohibited. The pre-Islamic Arabs also considered warfare to be blasphemous during these four months.

Muslims believe Rajab is the month in which ‘Alī ibn Abī Tālib, the fourth Rashidun caliph, was born.

Rajab is also the month during which Isra and Mi'raj (Muhammad's journey from Mecca to Jerusalem and then through the seven Heavens) took place.

Rajab and Shaʿbān are a prelude to the holy month of Ramaḍān.

Description
The word "Rajab" came from rajūb (رجوب), the sense of veneration or glorification, and Rajab was also formerly called Mudhar because the tribe of Mudhar did not change it but rather expected its time to be different than the rest of the Arabs, who changed and altered the months according to the state of war.

The name of Rajab literally means respected, regarded, and admired. It seems that the word is originally a Semitic one. There are two important events during the month, namely the birthday of Ali ibn Abi Talib and Muhammad's first revelation in Shia tradition. Also, war is forbidden during Rajab. There are other names for the month, such as Rajab Al-Morrajjab, Rajab Al-Asab, and Rajab Sharif.

For Shia
The Shi'a believe that the month has many virtues. According to some narrations, Rajab belongs to Ali, while Shaban is for Muhammad. Musa al-Kadhim (the seventh Shia imam) narrated that Rajab is like a river in heaven that is whiter and sweeter than honey.

Timing
The Islamic calendar is a purely lunar calendar, and months begin when the first crescent of a new moon is sighted. Since the lunar year is 11 to 12 days shorter than the solar year, Rajab migrates throughout the seasons. The estimated start and end dates for Rajab, based on the Umm al-Qura of Saudi Arabia, are:

Events
 The Battle of Tabouk took place in Rajab, 9 AH (October 630).
 The Second pledge at al-Aqabah took place in Rajab.
 6 Rajab: Many Sufi followers of the Chishti tariqa (path) celebrate the anniversary of Khawaja Moinuddin Chishti.
 7 Rajab: Twelvers observe the Festival of Imam Musa al-Kazim in dedication of Musā' al-Kādhim. This is so as to avoid missing celebrating the birth of the seventh imam, which took place in Safar. 
 22 Rajab, Koonday (tablecloth dinner) is organized by people friendly towards the Imams of the Ahlul Bayt among the Shias of South Asia. It is an occasion for Shias to discuss Allah and the Ahlul Bayt and to strengthen ties among the community with love and compassion.
 27 Rajab, event of Isra and Mi'raj.
 27 Rajab 583 AH, Conquest of Jerusalem by the Ayyubids

Births
 1 Rajab: Muhammad al-Baqir
 4 Rajab: Khwaja Banda Nawaz
 5 Rajab: ‘Alī al-Hadī
 9 Rajab: ‘Alī al-Asghar
 12 Rajab: Muhammad al-Taqī
 13 Rajab: ‘Alī ibn Abī Tālib
 14 Rajab: Mu'in al-Din Chishti
 20 Rajab: Sakina bint Hussain

Deaths
 3 Rajab: ‘Alī al-Naqī, Twelver Imam & Uwais al-Qarni
 8 Rajab: Nazim Al-Haqqani, a Turkish Cypriot Sufi Muslim sheykh and spiritual leader of the Naqshbandi tariqa.
 14 Rajab: Akhundzada_Saif-ur-Rahman_Mubarak, the founder of the Naqshbandi Mujaddidi Saifia Tariqa.
 15 Rajab: Zainab bint Ali
 18 Rajab: Abraham (according to Shi'a Islam)
 22 Rajab: Muawiyah I
 25 Rajab: Musā' al-Kādhim, seventh Twelver Imam
 26 Rajab: Abu Talib ibn Abdul Muttalib, uncle of Muhammad and father of Ali

References

External links
 Islamic-Western Calendar Converter (Based on the Arithmetical or Tabular Calendar)

7
Islamic terminology